Hoogewerf is a surname. Notable people with the surname include:

Rupert Hoogewerf (born 1970), British researcher and accountant
Simon Hoogewerf (born 1963), Canadian middle-distance runner

See also
Hoogerwerf